Robert Charles "Bobby" Jackson (born December 23, 1956 in Albany, Georgia) is a former cornerback for the National Football League New York Jets, retiring with 21 career interceptions and 3 fumble recoveries.

College
Jackson started at Florida State University and in 1993 was inducted into the FSU Hall of Fame.
 
Jackson once held the all time interception record at FSU, since broken by Terrell Buckley. Jackson also held the single game-punt return average of 45.3 yard per return (minimum three returns) -- a record since broken by Jet star Leon Washington.

Professional career
His professional career began when he was drafted in the sixth round of the National Football League draft of 1978. He went on to start all 16 games at cornerback his rookie year. He also tied for the team lead with 5 interceptions and was named to the “AFC All-Rookie Team” as a starter.

Jackson was named the Jets' defensive captain in the 1981 season.
He also led the team in interceptions 3 other times. 

Jackson was named “HBO Defensive Player of the Week” for his play in a game against the Minnesota Vikings in 1982.  Jackson scored two touchdowns in the Vikings game, one on an interception and another on a fumble return.  One touchdown was 77 yards and the other was 80 yards.

Jackson was named “All Pro” by Pro Football Weekly Magazine. 

Jackson was selected to the “All-Time Jet Team” as one of the top three corners in the history of the New York Jets.  He had a career total of 21 interceptions.

Personal life
Jackson has helped develop the professional aspirations of his two sons. The older son, Robert Thomas was a star player for Hofstra University and drafted by the San Francisco 49ers and the younger is currently seeking his place in personal training for all sports. He is the current owner of Action Training company based on Long Island, New York.''

References

1956 births
Living people
American football cornerbacks
New York Jets players
Florida State Seminoles football players
Sportspeople from Albany, Georgia